This list of fossil fishes described in 2015 is a list of new taxa of jawless vertebrates, placoderms, acanthodians, fossil cartilaginous fishes, bony fishes and other fishes of every kind that have been described during the year 2015, as well as other significant discoveries and events related to paleontology of fishes that occurred in the year 2015. The list only includes taxa at the level of genus or species.

Research
 A study of the body sizes of Devonian and Carboniferous vertebrates (jawless vertebrates, placoderms, acanthodians, cartilaginous fishes, ray-finned fishes and sarcopterygians, including tetrapods) is published by Sallan & Galimberti (2015), who conclude that following the Hangenberg event the majority of vertebrate lineages experienced persistent reductions in body size for at least 36 million years, and that the few large-bodied survivors of the Hangenberg event failed to diversify, while small-bodied survivors gave rise to all subsequent vertebrate lineages.
 A study on the skull anatomy of Acanthodes and its implications for inferring the phylogenetic placement of acanthodians is published by Brazeau & de Winter (2015).
 A study on the fossil specimens considered to be either decomposed or immature specimens of Triazeugacanthus affinis is published by Chevrinais, Cloutier & Sire (2015), who reinterpret the variation initially thought to be caused by various degrees of decomposition as corresponding to ontogenetic changes.
 A study on the development of saw-teeth in the Cretaceous ray Schizorhiza stromeri is published by Smith et al. (2015).
 Three large mackerel shark vertebrae, interpreted as belonging to a single individual with a calculated total body length of 6.3 m, are described from the Lower Cretaceous Duck Creek Formation (Texas, United States) by Frederickson, Schaefer & Doucette-Frederickson (2015).

New taxa

Jawless vertebrates

Placoderms

Acanthodians

Cartilaginous fishes

Bony fishes

Other fishes

References

2015 in paleontology